Utica greens is an Italian American dish made of escarole sauteed with garlic and olive oil. Most recipes include hot cherry peppers, pecorino cheese, bread crumbs, prosciutto or another cured meat, and sometimes chicken broth. In the 1980s, Italian restaurants in Utica began serving this variation on traditional Sicilian and Southern Italian sauteed greens; the dish has since spread to other cities in the United States. Other variations include greens with potatoes, romaine, kale, Swiss chard, and pignoli nuts.

See also
 Cuisine of the Mid-Atlantic states
 List of vegetable dishes

References

Further reading
 
 

Cuisine of New York (state)
Utica, New York
Vegetable dishes